Sensasi (formerly known as a video-on-demand service channel, HyppSensasi HD) is a 24-hour Malay language television network which was broadcast on the unifi IPTV television service.

The channel began broadcasting on August 4, 2014. Its content includes Malay-language programming, as well as foreign programming targeted at Malay viewers. The channel replaces EMAS, although the former channel had a completely different content.

Sister names
DEGUP
Dunia Sinema
Inspirasi
Salam HD
unifi Sports

External links 

Television channels and stations established in 2014 
2014 establishments in Malaysia
Malaysian brands
MSC Malaysia
Television in Malaysia
Mass media in Kuala Lumpur
TM Group of Companies